Eva Stiberg (26 December 1920 – 28 August 1990) was a Swedish stage and film actress. She is mostly famous for her role as Märta Grankvist in the Swedish TV show Vi på Saltkråkan (Life on Seacrow Island) and the films that followed, for which Astrid Lindgren wrote the script.

Selected filmography

 Young Bambi (voice role; Swedish dub) - Bambi (1943)
 Count Only the Happy Moments (1944)
Widower Jarl (1945)
Eva (1948)
 Dangerous Spring (1949)
 Stronger Than the Law (1951)
Farlig kurva (1952)
 In Lilac Time (1952)
 Unmarried Mothers (1953)
 Ursula, the Girl from the Finnish Forests (1953)
 Marianne (1953)
Seger i mörker (1954)
 A Goat in the Garden (1958)
Vi på Saltkråkan (1964)
Tjorven, Båtsman och Moses (1964) 
Tjorven och Mysak (1966)
Skrållan, Ruskprick och Knorrhane (1967)
Vi på Saltkråkan (1968)

References

Further reading

External links

1920 births
1990 deaths
Swedish film actresses
Swedish television actresses
20th-century Swedish actresses